Vallorcine station is a railway station in the commune of Vallorcine, in the French department of Haute-Savoie. It is located on the  gauge Saint-Gervais–Vallorcine line of SNCF. The station is the last one in France before the line crosses into Switzerland.

Services 
 the following services stop at Vallorcine:

References

External links 
 
 

Railway stations in Haute-Savoie